Alexander and Elizabeth Aull Graves House was a historic home located at Lexington, Lafayette County, Missouri.  It was built about 1874, and is a two-story, Italianate style brick dwelling. It had a combination hipped and gable roof. It features segmental arched windows and a bracketed bay window. Also on the property was the contributing frame shed.  It was the home of Congressman Alexander Graves.  It is no longer in existence.

It was listed on the National Register of Historic Places in 1993.

References

Houses on the National Register of Historic Places in Missouri
Italianate architecture in Missouri
Houses completed in 1874
Houses in Lafayette County, Missouri
National Register of Historic Places in Lafayette County, Missouri